The Vanne is a  river in France, a right tributary of the Yonne. It rises in the Aube department, in the village of Fontvannes, west of Troyes and flows into the Yonne at Sens.

The Vanne flows through the following departments and towns: 
Aube: Estissac
Yonne: Villeneuve-l'Archevêque, Malay-le-Grand, Sens

References

Rivers of France
Rivers of Grand Est
Rivers of Bourgogne-Franche-Comté
Rivers of Aube
Rivers of Yonne